List of Konica Minolta A-mount lenses:

See also
 List of Minolta A-mount lenses
 List of Minolta A-mount cameras
 List of Konica Minolta A-mount cameras
 List of Sony A-mount cameras
 List of Minolta V-mount lenses
 List of Minolta SR-mount lenses
 List of Sony A-mount lenses

References